Balderton railway station was a minor railway station serving the village of Balderton in Cheshire, England. It was located on the Great Western Railway (GWR) main line from London Paddington to Birkenhead Woodside. The  Balderton Tunnel is just south of the station site, and there is an automatic half-barrier (AHB) level crossing adjacent to the site today.

The  gauge Eaton Hall Railway, opened in 1896 to serve the estate of the Duke of Westminster, met the GWR line at Balderton.

History
The station was opened by the GWR and stayed with that company during the Grouping of 1923. On nationalisation in 1948, the line passed on to the Western Region of British Railways. Balderton was closed to passengers in 1952 and the goods service was closed in 1954.

References

Further reading

External links
 Balderton on navigable O.S. map
 Balderton station at Disused Stations by Subterranea Britannica
 Railscot on the North Wales Mineral Railway

Disused railway stations in Cheshire
Former Great Western Railway stations
Railway stations in Great Britain opened in 1901
Railway stations in Great Britain closed in 1952